De zigeunerin  is a 1914 short Dutch silent film directed by Louis H. Chrispijn.

Cast
 Christine van Meeteren	 ... 	Tiska
 Louis H. Chrispijn	... 	Prof. Mortman
 Theo Frenkel Jr.	... 	Jack Mortman
 Julia Cuypers	... 	Zus van prof. Mortman / Sister of prof. Mortman

References

External links 
 

Dutch silent short films
1914 films
Dutch black-and-white films
Films directed by Louis H. Chrispijn
1914 short films